This is a list of diseases of foliage plants belonging to the family Vitaceae.

Plant Species

Fungal diseases

See also
List of grape diseases

References
Common Names of Diseases, The American Phytopathological Society

Foliage plant (Vitaceae)